The 2006 Austin Wranglers season was the 3rd season for the franchise. Looking to rebound from a 6–10 season in 2005, the Wranglers started the season with a 4–0 start.  Finishing the season with a 10–6, reversal of last season, record the Wranglers were sent home in the first round by the Philadelphia Soul.

Stats

Offence

Quarterback

Running backs

Wide receivers

Austin Wranglers Season, 2006